Minolia subangulata, common name the subangular margarite, is a species of sea snail, a marine gastropod mollusk in the family Solariellidae.

Description
The size of the shell varies between 7 mm and 12 mm.

Distribution
This marine species occurs off Japan and Taiwan.

References

 Taki, I. and Oyama, K. (1954): Matajiro Yokoyama's the Pliocene and later faunas from the Kwanto region in Japan. Palaeontological Society of Japan, Special Papers, no.2, pp. 1–68, pls.1–49
 Oyama, K. (1973): Revision of Matajiro Yokoyama's type Mollusca from the Tertiary and Quaternary of the Kanto area. Palaeontological Society of Japan, Special Papers, no.17, pp. 1–148, p1s.1–57

External links
 

subangulata
Gastropods described in 1952